The 2019 AFLHCC season was the 19th season of senior Australian rules football in the Newcastle, Hunter and Central Coast regions, and the first year that the league was renamed from Black Diamond AFL to AFL Hunter Central Coast, under the AFL NSW/ACT banner.

The Grand Final was played on September 7, 2019, with Terrigal-Avoca beating Newcastle City by 10 points following their Grand Final defeat from the previous season. This is the 5th time that these two clubs have faced off in a Grand Final. The number of teams in the Black Diamond Cup (First Grade) competition was reduced to 10 teams after Lake Macquarie decided to field only one senior men's team to compete in the Black Diamond Plate (Reserves) competition after a winless 2018 season competing in the Black Diamond Cup.

The Representative Game was played on May 20 against AFL South Coast. AFL Hunter Central Coast won the game by 41 points, 12.16 (88) to 6.11 (47).

Ladder

Grand Final

References 

Australian rules football in New South Wales
2019 Australian Football League season